Jumu'atul-Widaa' ( meaning Friday of farewell, also called al-Jumu'ah al-Yateemah  or the orphaned Friday Urdu:  Al-Widaa Juma) is the last Friday in the month of Ramadhan before Eid-ul-Fitr.

Etymology
Jumu'ah comes from the Arabic word for "gathering". Widaa' means "farewell".

Historical background
Jumu'ah (Friday) is the day on which Muslim men are required  to attend congregation in lieu of the mid-day prayer. Women may attend, but are not obligated. Evidence of this congregation found in the Qur'an in Verse 9 of Chapter 62 (The Congregation, Friday):

O you who have believed, when [the adhan] is called for the prayer on the day of Jumu'ah [Friday], then proceed to the remembrance of Allah and leave trade. That is better for you, if you only knew.

Though Islam places no specific emphasis on any Friday as a holy day, some Muslims regard this one as the second holiest day of the month of Ramadan and one of the most important days of the year. Some Muslims spend a large part of their day on Jumu'atul-Widaa doing ibadah.

See also
Quds Day

References

Islamic holy days
Ramadan
Islamic terminology